Txema Guijarro García (born 15 April 1975) is a Spanish economist and politician of Podemos party. He currently serves as Member of the Congress of Deputies since 2016 and he chairs the Congress' Committee on Budget since 2019.

At the 2015 Spanish general election he was elected to the Congress of Deputies, representing Valencia province.

Prior to his election, Guijarro had worked for 8 years in Ecuador as an adviser to the government of Rafael Correa.

References

External links
Biography at Spanish Congress site

1975 births
Living people
Members of the 11th Congress of Deputies (Spain)
Members of the 12th Congress of Deputies (Spain)
Members of the 13th Congress of Deputies (Spain)
Podemos (Spanish political party) politicians
Politicians from Madrid
Spanish economists
Members of the 14th Congress of Deputies (Spain)